A memory clinic is a dedicated medical clinic specialising in the assessment and diagnosis of memory disorders. Memory clinics were first seen in the UK in the 1980s, mainly in academic research centres. There are by 2009 approximately 246 memory clinics but there are no official NHS figures and no specific standards or set models relating to them. The National Service Framework (NSF) for Older People stipulates that every specialist mental health service for older people should have a memory clinic (article 7.49) but it gives no specific guidelines for establishing one.

References
 White, E. "Memory clinics can make a difference" in Mental Health Nursing, May 1, 2004 (http://www.highbeam.com/doc/1P3-637381941.html)

The National Institute for Health and Care Excellence (NICE) provide guidelines (CG42) which identify the recommended interventions and approaches to assessing a person who is referred to a memory service.  Other than the use of structural imagery, there is as said previously no specific direction of what methods should be used as part of the cognitive assessment. This means that clinics across the Uk differ in how they assess and the type of professionals who staff the memory service.
Assessments  are performed by mental health nurses, psychiatrists, occupational therapists and psychologists.  One fairly common tool of assessment is the Addenbrookes Cognitive Examination which tests specific areas of cognition including memory, attention, orientation, language, verbal fluency and visuospatial abilities. There is also the use of a semi structured interview which gathers information about an individual's experience of memory problems, and the onset and progression of any difficulties with cognitive functioning, activities of daily living and behaviour.

Clinics
National Health Service